Rabo de Nube is a live album by jazz saxophonist Charles Lloyd recorded in Basel in 2007 by the Charles Lloyd Quartet featuring Jason Moran, Reuben Rogers and Eric Harland.

Reception
The Allmusic review by Thom Jurek awarded the album 4 stars and states "the band takes a very different approach to some familiar tunes... Ultimately, Rabo de Nube is yet another essential Lloyd offering from ECM. His sense of adventure is greater than ever, and his embrace of the tradition is equaled by his willingness to stretch it, bend it, turn it every which way but break it... Lloyd shows no signs of slowing down or simple contentment as he ages, and we are all the more fortunate for it".

Track listing
All compositions by Charles Lloyd except as indicated
 "Prometheus" - 14:42  
 "Migration of Spirit" - 10:14  
 "Booker's Garden" - 14:32  
 "Ramanujan" - 11:38  
 "La Colline de Monk" - 4:01  
 "Sweet Georgia Bright" - 12:16  
 "Rabo de Nube" (Silvio Rodríguez) - 7:36  
Recorded on April 27, 2007 in Basel, Switzerland

Personnel
Charles Lloyd - tenor saxophone, alto flute, tarogato
Jason Moran - piano
Reuben Rogers - bass
Eric Harland - drums
Manfred Eicher - executive producer

References

Charles Lloyd (jazz musician) live albums
2008 live albums
ECM Records live albums